On 14 January 2023 at about 3:30p.m., a Russian Kh-22 missile struck a nine-story residential building in Dnipro, Ukraine, on , 118, Sobornyi District in the right-bank part of the city, destroying one entrance and 236 apartments. On 19 January the official casualty rate was stated as 46 people killed (including 6 children) and 80 injured (12 in critical condition) and 11 people reported missing. 14 children were reported injured, and 39 inhabitants were rescued. The destruction left about 400 people homeless. The strike was part of months-long campaign of Russian strikes on Ukrainian civilians and civilian infrastructure that also had hit Dnipro.

This strike became the most destructive Russian attack on a residential building in Ukraine in the last six months. A three-day period of mourning was declared in Dnipro.

Timeline 

A local air alert began at 2:00 p.m. Ukrainian Air Defence Forces claimed it shot down 6 of 8 missiles over Dnipropetrovsk Oblast. At the moment, Ukraine does not have air defense systems to intercept such Kh-22 missiles. From the start of the February 2022 Russian invasion of Ukraine (already) 210 rockets of this type had been fired on Ukraine with none being shot down by air defenses.

Initially it was reported that the attack had killed 20 people (including a 15-year-old girl) and injured 73 (including 14 children; the youngest three years old; a 9-year-old girl was reported to be in serious condition). Nothing was known about the fate of another 26 people. A 23-year old woman, who was in a state of shock in the bathroom on the seventh floor, survived the attack but lost her parents. 

On 15 January the State Emergency Service of Ukraine reported that 23 people had been killed by a Russian missile strike on the building. By 1:15p.m. (the next day) 43 reports of missing persons had been received, 72 people sustained injuries, including 13 children, and 39 were rescued. In the afternoon of 15 January Ukrainian President Volodymyr Zelenskyy on Telegram expressed his condolences to the families of 25 people who were killed in the attack. In the morning of 16 January Governor of Dnipropetrovsk Oblast Valentyn Reznichenko updated the death toll to 35 people, including two children. 39 people had been rescued and 75 wounded, 14 of these being children. 35 residents of the building continued to be missing. The destruction of the building left about 400 people homeless. 236 apartments were destroyed. The search and rescue operation was called off on Tuesday 17, when the death toll stood at 44 including five children. 79 people had been injured and 39 rescued.

Among the victims was Mykhailo Korenovsky the head coach of Ukraine's national boxing team from Dnipropetrovsk Oblast.

Weapon
The missile that struck the building was a Kh-22 anti-ship missile, the same type used in an attack on a shopping center in Kremenchuk on 27 June 2022. Ukrainian Air Force Commander, Lieutenant General Mykola Oleschuk, said that the Ukrainian army at the time of the incident had no weapons to shoot down such missiles, and that during the year of full-scale war, out of 210 Kh-22 missiles launched in Ukraine, not a single one was shot down. Oleshchuk called earlier reports about the downing of such missiles unreliable and erroneous. 

Russia launched five Kh-22 missiles across Ukraine on 14 January.

Investigation 
On 15 January 2023 the office  of the Prosecutor General of Ukraine states that the attack could only have been carried out by the 52nd Guards Aviation Regiment based in Shaikivka. The same day, a list of military personnel directly involved in the missile launch was published on the Molfar Global website (OSINT community) in which 44 out of 52 people from the 52nd Guards Aviation Regiment were named. This was the same regiment that struck the Amstor shopping centre in Kremenchuk on June 27, 2022.

On 16 January 2023 the Security Service of Ukraine (SBU) confirmed the participation of the military of the 52nd Aviation Regiment of the Russian Federation in the missile attack. It singled out six Russian soldiers in particular.

Reactions

Ukrainian President Volodymyr Zelenskyy said the Russian attack targeted civilian apartment blocks and as result was a war crime. In his daily evening appeal of 15 January President Zelenskyy addressed the Russian citizens who had not spoken out against Russia's military invasion of Ukraine in Russian stating: "Your cowardly silence, an attempt to ride out what is happening, will end with these same terrorists coming for you one day." 

The United Nations called the images coming out from the aftermath of the attack "horrifying".

The French Ministry of Foreign Affairs called the attack a war crime and noted that it indicates Russia's intention to escalate the war.

President of Lithuania Gitanas Nausėda stated that Russia would definitely bear responsibility for attacks on peaceful cities. On January 14 a three-day mourning was declared in Dnipro.

The Russian Ministry of Defence confirmed their responsibility for the missile strikes in Dnipro. However, Vladimir Putin's press secretary Dmitry Peskov stated that Russian forces never attack residential buildings and that the residential building had probably collapsed because of a Ukrainian air defense counterattack.

Dnipro mayor Borys Filatov said that the Russians might have intended to target a nearby thermal power station.

Memorials

An impromptu memorial to the victims of the attack appeared in Moscow as people brought flowers to the statue of Lesya Ukrainka. The police detained some of them.

See also
Zaporizhzhia residential building airstrike

References

External links

 

January 2023 events in Ukraine
Airstrikes during the 2022 Russian invasion of Ukraine
Attacks on buildings and structures in Ukraine
History of Dnipro
War crimes during the 2022 Russian invasion of Ukraine
Airstrikes conducted by Russia